Ernest Henry Newman (27 December 1887–?) was an English professional footballer who played for Walsall, Stockport County and Tottenham Hotspur.

Football career
Newman began his football career at Walsall. In 1909 he joined Stockport County where he featured in 19 matches and scored five goals. The inside forward went on to play for Tottenham Hotspur. Between 1909–13 Newman made 32 appearances and scored seven goals in all competitions for the White Hart Lane club before ending his playing career.

References 

1887 births
English footballers
English Football League players
Walsall F.C. players
Stockport County F.C. players
Tottenham Hotspur F.C. players
Footballers from Birmingham, West Midlands
Year of death missing
Association football inside forwards